Heliura emerentia is a moth of the subfamily Arctiinae. It was described by Paul Dognin in 1898. It is found in Ecuador.

References

 Natural History Museum Lepidoptera generic names catalog

Arctiinae
Moths described in 1898